Westwood Community High School is a public senior high school located in Fort McMurray, Alberta and is part of the Fort McMurray Public School District.  The school is situated in the community of Thickwood and currently accommodates approximately 600 students. It offers Advanced Placement courses.

Academics
Westwood continues to rank the highest academically out of the five high schools in the city, with the vast majority of its graduates attending post-secondary institutions across the country. Former students have excelled in national math and science competitions, and Wood Buffalo's annual delegation for the Canada-Wide Science Fair (CWSF) has been composed mostly of Westwood students. The school has also produced one Schulich Leader Scholar (2016) and numerous Loran Scholar nominees.

Advanced Placement
The Advanced Placement (AP) courses currently offered in the school include Calculus, Biology, Chemistry, Physics, English Literature and Composition, English Language and Composition, European History, and Computer Science A.  All AP courses have been audited by the College Board to guarantee the satisfaction of the AP curriculum.

Students enroll in Pre-Advanced Placement courses for grades 10 and 11 and complete full AP courses in grade 12. The exception to this rule is English Language and Composition, which is offered in grade 11.  They have the option to take additional AP courses, such as Art and History, online; they can also challenge multiple AP exams by paying a non-refundable registration fee without taking any AP courses. Exams are graded on a scale of 1 to 5, with 3 equaling a passing score; to receive post-secondary course credit, students must achieve a score of 4 or 5.

Athletics
The school has multiple sports teams, including Basketball, Soccer, Football, Volleyball, Badminton and Golf. All athletic teams participate in the Alberta Schools Athletic Association. Trojans have won many regional and provincial zones tournaments.

Fine and performing arts

Musical Theatre  and Dramatic Arts
Westwood Cheepiyak Theatre Company provides well-developed Theatre and Musical Theatre programs. Each year a large scale production is held, with a technical, musical and performing cast composed of students. The school usually rotates dramatic productions and musical theatre each year, offering students a variety in styles, genres and types of script work to present. In addition, original dramaturge plays have been created and performed. The Musical Theatre component is a credited program for Westwood students, along with Technical theatre and stage management.

WIT -Westwood Improv Team
Westwood has also made a name for itself through their Improv team, WIT (Westwood Improv Team).  WIT has participated in provincial &  national festivals - most notably at the Canadian Improv Games tournaments.  The team has won awards at all levels, and former members have gone on to impressive careers as performing artists, directors, designers and technicians.

WIT has had a successful legacy of coming in the top five provincial teams since their early days in the 90's. In 1997, WIT was the first team outside of Ontario to place first and win a gold medal at National Competition.WIT has won Three medals at National Competition in Ottawa. The team practice twice weekly and perform once a week during student lunch breaks. Additionally, WIT can often be seen at community events, fundraisers and activities.

One Act Plays and Touring Shows
In addition, Westwood Community High School hosts One-Act plays, mostly directed, and often written by students.  Westwood has won numerous awards at the Provincial One Act Festival since  and attends Regional One Act festivals annually. Award-winning plays to head to the Provincial Festival have been: The Raven (2003), Powerplay (2006), Wanda's Visit (2008), The Insanity of Mary Girard (2010), Elephant's Graveyard (2013), A Rope Against the Sun (2015), and I Never Saw Another Butterfly (2016). Additionally, Westwood was nominated to attend the Edinburgh Fringe Festival in 2012 -where they performed Rudyard Kipling's, The Junglebook. A later touring performance was taken to the Fringe in 2014 wit Robert Munsch production of Paperbags, PrincessesNPuddles.

Westwood can offer Acting and Touring course credits for involvements in these productions. Students who don't have enough hours or have not qualified for specific criteria can also build volunteer hours which can be added as credits.

Visual Art 
Westwood students in Visual Art courses have the opportunity to display their artwork in regional art exhibitions and festivals such as Spring Splash, Suncor Art Show and exhibition and the Quad High Art show. Senior Artists work that wins annual FMPSD district awards can be seen prominently displayed at the Main building of Fort McMurray Public Schools District hallways.

Music 
Finally, Westwood's performing arts department in rounded out by their music programming.  Westwood is well known within the community both for the variety of music courses offered, and the caliber of performance shown by their students.  Course offerings include Instrumental Music, Choir, Show Choir, Jazz Band, and Guitar.

Extracurricular activities
The school has an inclusive list of clubs that students can participate in. This includes Student Council, Colours Multicultural Club, and Model United Nations among others. Westwood's Green Initiative team has installed solar panels in the school, constructed an eco-friendly greenhouse and school garden, and won three consecutive BPA+ grants of $10,000 each. The school's Project Kenya club has built a school in Kenya and holds fundraisers for the underprivileged. Each school year, Westwood is represented at national and international robotics championships, with the robotics team garnering numerous awards.

Graduating students can take part in the Graduation Committee and are given the chance to plan and decorate for their prom at the end of the year. Students in any grade can become a member of the Yearbook Committee, and help photograph school events and activities.

Spirit Day
An entire school day is dedicated to a traditional event known as Spirit Day, planned and executed by school administration and student council. Usually held on a Friday, the staff and student body is divided into four groups: Team Blue, Team Red, Team Yellow and Team Green. Students and teachers dress in accordance with their team colour; this can include face-painting and colourful costumes. Throughout the day, students can participate in various games and challenges to earn raffle tickets in order to win prizes.

Team competitions are also held, in which teams collectively attempt to win challenges such as duct-taping a team member to the gym wall, successfully fitting every team member into a small circle, trying to cheer the loudest out of the four teams, and more. At the end of the event, a raffle is held in the gymnasium where tickets are drawn and students win prizes such as gift-cards, headphones, clothing or electronics.  Past prizes have included iPads, smart phones, an electric guitar and several popular gaming systems.

The day concludes with the announcement of the winning team, and a barbecue hosted by the staff.

References

Buildings and structures in Fort McMurray
High schools in Alberta
1986 establishments in Alberta
Educational institutions established in 1986